Beagle Commonwealth Marine Reserve is a 2,928 km2 marine protected area within Australian waters located in Bass Strait off the coast of Victoria and near Tasmania's Flinders Island. The reserve was established in 2007 and is part of the South-east Commonwealth Marine Reserve Network.

The reserve boundaries enclose Kent Group National Park and the Hogan and Curtis Island groups. Nearby to the north-east is Wilsons Promontory Marine National Park.

Protection
The entirety of the Beagle marine reserve is IUCN protected area category VI and zoned as 'Multiple Use'.

Shipwrecks
Located within the Beagle marine reserve are the wrecks of the SS Cambridge (sunk by German WWII mine) and Eliza Davis, both are east of Wilson's Promontory.

Gallery

See also

Commonwealth marine reserves
Protected areas of Australia

Notes

References

External links
Beagle Commonwealth Marine Reserve Network website

South-east Commonwealth Marine Reserves Network
Protected areas established in 2007
Protected areas of Bass Strait